This is a list of schools in Sandwell, West Midlands, England.

State-funded schools

Primary schools

Abbey Infant School, Smethwick
Abbey Junior School, Smethwick
Albert Pritchard Infant School, Wednesbury
All Saints CE Primary School, West Bromwich
Annie Lennard Primary School, Smethwick
Bearwood Primary School, Smethwick
Blackheath Primary School, Rowley Regis
Bleakhouse Primary School, Oldbury
Brandhall Primary School, Oldbury
Brickhouse Primary School, Rowley Regis
Burnt Tree Primary School, Tividale
Cape Primary School, Smethwick
Causeway Green Primary School, Oldbury
Christ Church CE Primary School, Oldbury
Corngreaves Academy, Cradley Heath
Crocketts Community Primary School, Smethwick
Devonshire Infant Academy, Smethwick
Devonshire Junior Academy, Smethwick
Eaton Valley Primary School, West Bromwich
Ferndale Primary School, Great Barr
Galton Valley Primary School, Smethwick
George Betts Primary Academy, Smethwick
Glebefields Primary School, Tipton
Grace Mary Primary School, Tividale
Great Bridge Primary School, Great Bridge
Grove Vale Primary School, Great Barr
Hall Green Primary School, West Bromwich
Hamstead Infant School, Great Barr
Hamstead Junior School, Great Barr
Hanbury Primary School, West Bromwich
Hargate Primary School, West Bromwich
Harvills Hawthorn Primary School, West Bromwich
Hateley Heath Academy, West Bromwich
Highfields Primary School, Rowley Regis
Holy Name RC Primary School, Great Barr
Holy Trinity CE Primary School, West Bromwich
Holyhead Primary Academy, Wednesbury
Joseph Turner Primary School, Tipton
Jubilee Park Academy, Tipton
King George V Primary School, West Bromwich
Langley Primary School, Oldbury
Lightwoods Primary Academy, Oldbury
Lodge Primary School, West Bromwich
Lyng Primary School, West Bromwich
Mesty Croft Primary, Wednesbury
Moat Farm Infant School, Oldbury
Moat Farm Junior School, Oldbury
Moorlands Primary School, West Bromwich
Newtown Primary School, West Bromwich
Oakham Primary School, Tividale
Ocker Hill Academy, Tipton
Ocker Hill Infant School, Tipton
Old Hill Primary School, Cradley Heath
Old Park Primary School, Wednesbury
Our Lady & St Hubert's RC Primary School, Oldbury
Park Hill Primary School, Wednesbury
Pennyhill Primary School, West Bromwich
Perryfields Primary School, Oldbury
The Priory Primary School, Friar Park
Reddal Hill Primary School, Cradley Heath
Rood End Primary School, Oldbury
Rounds Green Primary School, Oldbury
Rowley Hall Primary School, Rowley Regis
Ryders Green Primary School, West Bromwich
Sacred Heart Primary School, Tipton
St Francis Xavier RC Primary School, Oldbury
St Gregory's RC Primary School, Smethwick
St James CE Primary School, Oldbury
St John Bosco RC Primary School, West Bromwich
St John's CE Primary Academy, Wednesbury
St Margaret's CE Primary School, Great Barr
St Martin's CE Primary School, Tipton
St Mary Magdalene CE Primary School, West Bromwich
St Mary's RC Primary School, Wednesbury
St Matthew's CE Primary School, Smethwick
St Paul's CE Primary School, Tipton
St Philip's RC Primary School, Smethwick
Shireland Hall Primary Academy, Smethwick
Shireland Technology Primary School, Smethwick
Silvertrees Academy, Tipton
Springfield Primary School, Rowley Regis
Summerhill Primary Academy, Tipton
Tameside Primary Academy, Wednesbury
Temple Meadow Primary School, Cradley Heath
Timbertree Academy, Cradley Heath
Tipton Green Junior School, Tipton
Tividale Community Primary School, Tividale
Tividale Hall Primary School, Tividale
Uplands Manor Primary School, Smethwick
Victoria Park Academy, Smethwick
Wednesbury Oak Primary School, Tipton
Whitecrest Primary School, Great Barr
Wood Green Junior School, Wednesbury
Yew Tree Primary School, Yew Tree

Secondary schools 

Bristnall Hall Academy, Oldbury
George Salter Academy, West Bromwich
Gospel Oak School, Tipton
Health Futures UTC, West Bromwich
Holly Lodge High School, Smethwick
Oldbury Academy, Oldbury
Ormiston Forge Academy, Cradley Heath
Ormiston Sandwell Community Academy, Oldbury
Perryfields Academy, Oldbury
The Phoenix Collegiate, West Bromwich
Q3 Academy Great Barr, Great Barr
Q3 Academy Langley, Oldbury
Q3 Academy Tipton, Tipton
St Michael's Church of England High School, Rowley Regis
Sandwell Academy, West Bromwich
Shireland Collegiate Academy, Smethwick
Stuart Bathurst Catholic High School, Wednesbury
West Bromwich Collegiate Academy, West Bromwich
Wodensborough Ormiston Academy, Wednesbury
Wood Green Academy, Wednesbury

Special and alternative schools

Albright Education Centre, Tipton
Elm Tree Primary Academy, West Bromwich
High Point Academy, Wednesbury
The Meadows School, Oldbury
The Orchard School, Oldbury
The Primrose Centre, Rowley Regis
Sandwell Community School, West Bromwich
Shenstone Lodge School, Shenstone, Staffordshire
The Westminster School, Rowley Regis

*This school is located in Staffordshire, but is for pupils from Sandwell

Further education
Sandwell College

Independent schools

Primary and preparatory schools
Al Khair School, Oldbury

Senior and all-through schools
The British Muslim School, West Bromwich

Special and alternative schools
Compass Community School Victoria Park, Tipton
Dudley Port School, Tipton
The Regis Academy, Smethwick
Sandwell Valley School, West Bromwich

See also
Defunct schools in Sandwell

Sandwell
Schools in Sandwell